The USA International Speedway was an oval located near Lakeland, Florida, United States, that opened in 1995. The track was a .75-mile-long concrete paved oval with 14° banked turns. USA International Speedway was closed with the final race on August 2, 2008. In 2010 the track was stripped of its grandstands and control tower. In early 2012 the track was completely demolished, a warehouse now sits on the property. The site lies next to the former site of Lakeland Motorsports Park, on Florida State Road 33 just north of exit 38 on Interstate 4, where an Amazon warehouse now exists.

In 1977, Lakeland International Speedway hosted Florida Sunfest, a music festival featuring 20 acts, including Jimmy Buffett. It was the largest music festival in Florida history, attracting over 100,000 fans. The event was created and produced by Richard Flanzer, of AtlanticPacific Music.

The USAR Hooters Pro Cup Series had a race at the speedway in early March and the final championship race in mid to late November. There were also several series that tested there, including the ARCA Racing Series, CRA Super Series, and the NASCAR Cup Series.

USA International Speedway hosted three NASCAR Southeast Series events from 1999 until 2001 and five races of ASA National Tour from 2000 until 2004. All the race winners had driven in NASCAR: Gary St. Amant, Mike Garvey, Joey Clanton had one win apiece, and Butch Miller won twice.

The track hosted one ARCA Racing Series event in 2007. The race was won by future NASCAR Camping World Truck Series champion James Buescher.

The speedway also hosted 40 CARS X-1R Pro Cup Series races from 1997 until 2008. Some NASCAR drivers such as Chad Chaffin, Mario Gosselin, Michael Ritch, Scott Wimmer, Bobby Gill, Shane Huffman, Clay Rogers, Benny Gordon, Brian Vickers, and Joey Logano won races at the track.

ARCA Series event
The Construct Corps–Palm Beach Grading 250 was an Automobile Racing Club of America race at USA International Speedway in Florida. It was only held during the 2007 season.

Race was extended from 250 to 253 laps due to a green-white-checker finish.

External links
Official ARCA Website
Official USA International Speedway Website
USA International Speedway race results at Racing-Reference

ARCA Menards Series tracks
ARCA Menards Series races
NASCAR tracks
Motorsport venues in Florida
Sports venues in Lakeland, Florida
Motorsport competitions in Florida
Sports in Lakeland, Florida
Defunct motorsport venues in the United States
1995 establishments in Florida
Sports venues completed in 1995
2008 disestablishments in Florida
Sports venues demolished in 2012
Demolished sports venues in Florida
2007 in American motorsport
2007 in Florida